Rammaka Mathopo is a Judge of the Constitutional Court of South Africa. He was appointed by Cyril Ramaphosa on 24 December 2021, and began his service on 1 January 2022. He is a former judge of the Supreme Court of Appeal.

References

Year of birth missing (living people)
Living people
Judges of the Constitutional Court of South Africa